The 2013 Laurence Olivier Awards were held on Sunday 28 April 2013 at the Royal Opera House, London. The awards were sponsored by MasterCard for the third consecutive year and presented by Hugh Bonneville and Sheridan Smith, with music from the BBC Concert Orchestra. Live coverage of the awards was provided by BBC Radio 2, presented by Ken Bruce and for the first time in over a decade, the awards were televised, with a highlights programme on ITV1.

Winners and nominees 
The nominations were announced on 26 March 2013 in 24 categories.

Guest performers 
Michael Ball, performing "Love Changes Everything" from Aspects of Love
Tade Biesinger, performing "Electricity" from the musical Billy Elliot
Petula Clarke, performing "With One Look" from the musical Sunset Boulevard
Heather Headley, performing "I Will Always Love You" from the musical The Bodyguard
Idina Menzel, performing "That's How I Say Goodbye" and "Don't Rain on My Parade"
Tim Minchin, performing "My House" from Matilda the Musical (not televised)
Matthew Morrison, performing a medley from West Side Story
Sheridan Smith, performing "Diamonds Are a Girl's Best Friend"
Cast of Top Hat
Cast of Cabaret
Cast of A Chorus Line
Cast of the UK tour of Cats

Productions with multiple nominations and awards
The following 18 productions, including three operas, received multiple nominations:

 8: The Curious Incident of the Dog in the Night-Time
 7: Top Hat
 6: Sweeney Todd
 5: The Audience and Kiss Me, Kate
 4: The Bodyguard, Constellations and Twelfth Night
 3: Cabaret
 2: Apollo/Aeternum/24 Preludes, Billy Budd, A Chorus Line, The Effect, Long Day's Journey into Night, Macbeth, The Master and Margarita, Old Times and This House

The following five productions received multiple awards:

 7: The Curious Incident of the Dog in the Night-Time
 3: Sweeney Todd and Top Hat
 2: Apollo/Aeternum/24 Preludes and The Audience

See also
 67th Tony Awards

External links
 Previous Olivier Winners – 2013

Laurence Olivier Awards ceremonies
Laurence Olivier
Laurence Olivier Awards
Laurence Olivier Awards
Laurence Olivier Awards
Royal Opera House